Ağrı Dağı Efsanesi ("The Legend of Mt Ararat") is a 1971 Turkish-language opera by Çetin Işıközlü. Mount Ararat is Mount Ağrı, Ağrı Dağı, in Turkish (:wikt:ağrı can also mean "pain", "affliction"). The plot is based on the 1970 epic novel of the same name, Ağrıdağı Efsanesi, by Yaşar Kemal.

Recordings
Ağrı Dağı Efsanesi Ankara State Opera & Ballet Orchestra, Erol Erdinc

References

Turkish-language operas
1971 operas
Mount Ararat